Basankusu Airstrip  is an airport serving Basankusu, a city on the Lulonga River in Équateur Province, Democratic Republic of the Congo.

The Basankusu non-directional beacon (Ident: BSU) is located on the field.

See also

 List of airports in the Democratic Republic of the Congo
 Transport in the Democratic Republic of the Congo

References

External links
 HERE Maps - Basankusu
 OurAirports - Basankusu Airport
 FallingRain - Basankusu Airport
 OpenStreetMap - Basankusu
 

Basankusu
Airports in the Province of Équateur